Shaykh al-Islam Baha'i Mehmed Efendi (1595-6/1601, Istanbul - 3 January 1654) was Ottoman jurist, theologian, poet and scholar. 

He was first appointed as Shaykh al-Islam in 1649.
Some of his fatwas are written in verse of which 4 of them are available now.

His best known ruling was his lawful pronouncing of smoking and ending the prohibitions and repressions of the early 17th century.

His body is buried in Fatih mosque.

Divan 
The Divan of Baha'i consists of 6 qasida, 2 masnavi, 4 stanza, 2 history stanza, 40 ghazal and 8 ruba'i.

Notes

References 
 
 
 

Turkish poets
1590s births
16th-century births
1654 deaths
Year of birth uncertain